Javier 'Javi' Paños García-Villamil (born 21 March 1991 in Alicante) is a Spanish former footballer who last played for FC Jove Español San Vicente as a midfielder.

Club career
A product of Elche CF's youth system, Paños was promoted to the main squad for the 2009–10 season, in the second division, as well as still appearing for the reserves. He made his first-team debut on 10 April 2010, in a 3–0 away win against Real Unión, and ended the campaign with four appearances, one as a starter.

In the following season, Paños was loaned to another team in the city, amateurs Torrellano Illice CF. He returned to his parent club late into the season, appearing against Xerez CD.

In 2012 summer Paños was released by the Valencians, and signed with FC Jove Español San Vicente, in Tercera División. Paños played for Jove Español for two seasons before retiring in 2015.

Personal life
He is the brother of Sandra, an international footballer with Spain women's national football team who plays for FC Barcelona in the Primera División.

References

External links
 
 
 

1991 births
Living people
Footballers from Alicante
Spanish footballers
Association football midfielders
Segunda División players
Tercera División players
Elche CF Ilicitano footballers
Elche CF players